Sir Michael Charles Wood KCMG (born 5 February 1947) is a member of the International Law Commission. He was the principal Legal Adviser to the Foreign and Commonwealth Office between 1999 and 2006. During 35 years as a lawyer in the FCO, he attended many international conferences, including the United Nations Conference on the Law of the Sea. He now practices as a barrister from chambers at 20 Essex Street, in London.

Wood gave evidence to the Iraq Inquiry in November 2009 and in January 2010, in which he stated that he advised Jack Straw, then Foreign Secretary, that the invasion of Iraq was illegal without a second United Nations resolution.

Wood was Principal Legal Advisor at International Court of Justice advisory opinion on Kosovo's declaration of independence.

References

External links 
 Lecture by Sir Michael Wood on International Law and the Use of Force: What Happens in Practice? in the Lecture Series of the United Nations Audiovisual Library of International Law
 Lecture by Sir Michael Wood on The Interpretation of Security Council Resolutions in the Lecture Series of the United Nations Audiovisual Library of International Law
 Introductory note by Sir Michael Wood on the Statute of the International Law Commission in the Historic Archives of the United Nations Audiovisual Library of International Law
 Introductory note by Sir Michael Wood on the Convention on the Prevention and Punishment of Crimes against Internationally Protected Persons, including Diplomatic Agents, in the Historic Archives of the United Nations Audiovisual Library of International Law
 Introductory note by Sir Michael Wood on the Convention on Special Missions in the Historic Archives of the United Nations Audiovisual Library of International Law

1947 births
Living people
British civil servants
Members of Gray's Inn
Knights Commander of the Order of St Michael and St George
Lawyers awarded knighthoods
Members of HM Diplomatic Service
People educated at Solihull School
Alumni of Trinity Hall, Cambridge
Members of the International Law Commission